Jo Jeong-ik (born 21 January 1983), better known by his stage name Yoo Gun, is an American-born South Korean actor.

Early life
Jo Jeong-ik was born in Arizona, United States to Korean American parents. He came to South Korea in the 1990s as a teenager. He is a first cousin of coloratura soprano Sumi Jo.

Career
Under the stage name Yoo Gun, he began his entertainment career in 1997 as a singer in South Korean boy band Oppa. Yoo rose to popularity through his first leading role in the 2006 television drama Hello, God! (안녕하세요 하느님); he played a mentally challenged character based on "Charlie" in the novel Flowers for Algernon. Supporting roles followed in the comedy films Dasepo Naughty Girls, Project Makeover, Mission Possible: Kidnapping Granny K, and My Mighty Princess. Yoo underwent six months of martial arts training for his next leading role in the action drama Fight, which aired on cable in 2008. Besides appearing in the TV series Bad Couple, Can't Stop Now, and Prosecutor Princess, he also made his theater debut in 2010 in the stage play Thief's Diary.

In 2011, he renounced his U.S. citizenship in order to serve in the South Korean army. Yoo enlisted as an ordinary soldier in March 2011, and was later transferred to the Defense Media Agency in October 2011, where he took over as DJ of the military radio program This is Friends FM Yoo Gun. He also appeared on the KFN (Korean Forces Network) TV program March in 2012.

After his discharge in December 2012, Yoo quickly resumed his career, appearing on the travel program The World is Delicious (오감만족 세상은 맛있다) in an episode about Brazil, followed by a cameo on the melodrama That Winter, the Wind Blows. Yoo then headlined the KBS1 daily drama Sincerity Moves Heaven in 2013.

Filmography
Note: the whole section is referenced.

Television series
 Graceful Friends (JTBC, 2020)
 365: Repeat the Year (MBC, 2020) (cameo, ep. 1–2)
I Wanna Hear Your Song (KBS2, 2019)
The Last Empress (SBS, 2018–2019)
Sweet Enemy (SBS, 2017)
Dr. Frost (OCN, 2014)
Hotel King (MBC, 2014)
Steal Heart (jTBC, 2014)
A Tale of Two Sisters (KBS1, 2013)
That Winter, the Wind Blows (SBS, 2013) (cameo, ep. 4)
Drama Special "Texas Hit" (KBS2, 2010)
Prosecutor Princess (SBS, 2010)
Can't Stop Now (MBC, 2009)
Drama City "LoveForSale.com" (KBS2, 2008)
Fight (tvN, 2008)
Here He Comes (MBC, 2008)
Bad Couple (SBS, 2007)
Hello, God! (KBS2, 2006)
Something About 1% (MBC, 2004)

Film
 Insane (2016)
Where are To Go? (2013)
My Mighty Princess (2008)
Mission Possible: Kidnapping Granny K (2007)
Project Makeover (2007)
Dasepo Naughty Girls (2006)

Variety show
함 사세요 (MBC Every 1, 2009)
Yoo Gun's Love Fighter (Mnet, 2007–2008)

Music video
As a Man, Not a Friend (Lee Seok-hoon, 2013) 
Love Actually (JJ, 2007)
Handkerchief (Kim Dong-wan, 2007)

Theater
Crash Course in Love (2010)
Thief's Diary (2009)

References

External links
Yoo Gun at Star Fox Entertainment 
Yoo Gun Fan Cafe at Daum 

1983 births
Living people
Male actors from Arizona
Former United States citizens
South Korean male television actors
South Korean male film actors
South Korean male stage actors
Seoul Institute of the Arts alumni
L&Holdings artists